Colours (stylized in all caps) is the second extended play by Canadian recording artist PartyNextDoor. It was released on December 3, 2014, digitally through OVO Sound, the label of the rapper Drake, and PartyNextDoor's SoundCloud page. The EP was released to streaming services for the first time on January 29, 2021, and includes four extra tracks which were previously released as Colours 2 in 2017.

Release
On December 3, 2014, PartyNextDoor announced dates for his upcoming PND LIVE tour, which included cities in North America and Europe. Alongside the announcement of the tour dates he released the 4 track EP, featuring appearances from Travis Scott and Cash Out. The EP was released on his SoundCloud page and his website.

Reception
Despite a lack of heavy promotion, the EP was well received by fans and has garnered over 67 million plays on PartyNextDoor's SoundCloud page as of January 2016.

Track listing
Colours track listing

Notes
  signifies a co-producer
  signifies an additional producer

Personnel
 PartyNextDoor – primary artist
 Noel "Gadget" Campbell – mixing

References

2014 EPs
2021 EPs
Albums produced by Cardo
Albums produced by PartyNextDoor
PartyNextDoor albums
OVO Sound EPs
Warner Records EPs